Declan Curran (born 15 April 1952) was a rugby union player who represented Australia.

Curran, a prop, was born in Ballina, New South Wales and claimed a total of 5 international rugby caps for Australia.

His father, Frank Curran, played Rugby League for Australia.

References

Further reading

1952 births
Australian rugby union players
Australia international rugby union players
Rugby union props
People from the Northern Rivers
Living people
Rugby union players from New South Wales